Givani Smith (born February 27, 1998) is a Canadian professional ice hockey forward for the  Florida Panthers of the National Hockey League (NHL). He was drafted 46th overall by the Detroit Red Wings in the 2016 NHL Entry Draft.

Playing career
Prior to turning professional, Smith played four seasons in the Ontario Hockey League. In 236 games between the Barrie Colts, Guelph Storm and Kitchener Rangers, he recorded 73 goals, 62 assists, and 411 penalty minutes. He led the league in penalty minutes in 2015–16 and 2016–17. During the 2018–19 season in his rookie year, he recorded six goals and seven assists in 64 games for the Grand Rapids Griffins of the American Hockey League (AHL).

On October 25, 2019, Smith was recalled by the Detroit Red Wings. Prior to being recalled he recorded two goals and two assists in four games for the Griffins. He made his NHL debut for the Red Wings later that night in a game against the Buffalo Sabres where he recorded two shots on goal and one hit in 11:01 time on ice. Smith was assigned to the Griffins on October 30. He appeared in three games for the Red Wings, where he recorded four shots on goal and three hits in 10:32 average time on ice per game. On December 31, 2019, Smith was again recalled by the Red Wings. Prior to being recalled he recorded four goals and nine assists in 22 games with the Griffins. On January 14, 2020, Smith scored his first career NHL goal against Thomas Greiss of the New York Islanders. On February 16, 2021, Smith was reassigned to the Griffins. Prior to being reassigned he recorded one goal and three assists, 11 penalty minutes, 10 shots on goal and 15 hits in 9:55 average time on ice in eight games for the Red Wings.

On December 19, 2022, the Red Wings traded Smith to the Florida Panthers in exchange for Michael Del Zotto. Prior to being traded, he recorded two goals and three assists in 19 games for the Griffins during the 2022–23 season. He also appeared in two games for the Red Wings.

Personal life
He is the younger brother of NHL player Gemel Smith.

Career statistics

Regular season and playoffs

International

References

External links
 

1998 births
Living people
Barrie Colts players
Black Canadian ice hockey players
Charlotte Checkers (2010–) players
Detroit Red Wings draft picks
Detroit Red Wings players
Florida Panthers players
Grand Rapids Griffins players
Guelph Storm players
Kitchener Rangers players
Ice hockey people from Toronto